The Romanian Greek Catholic Eparchy of Cluj-Gherla is an eparchy of the Byzantine Rite of the Romanian Greek Catholic Church. It is a suffragan of the Romanian Greek Catholic Major Archeparchy of Făgăraș and Alba Iulia.

Eparchs
Ioan Alexi (16 Nov 1854 Confirmed – 29 Jun 1863 Died) 
Ioan Vancea (25 Sep 1865 Appointed – 21 Dec 1868 Appointed, Archbishop of Fagaras e Alba Iulia (Romanian)) 
Mihail Pavel (23 Dec 1872 Appointed – 15 May 1879 Appointed, Bishop of Oradea Mare {Gran Varadino} (Romanian)
Ioan Sabo (15 May 1879 Appointed – May 1911 Died) 
Vasile Hossu (16 Dec 1911 Appointed – 13 Jan 1916 Died) 
Iuliu Hossu (21 Apr 1917 Appointed – 28 May 1970 Died) (Cardinal in pectore, 1969)
George Guțiu (14 Mar 1990 Appointed – 18 Jul 2002 Retired) 
Florentin Crihălmeanu (18 Jul 2002 Succeeded – 12 Jan 2021 Died)
Claudiu-Lucian Pop (since 14 Apr 2021)

References

External links
 Official website 

Cluj-Gherla
Romanian Greek Catholic Church dioceses
Roman Catholic dioceses and prelatures established in the 19th century
Religious organizations established in 1854
1854 establishments in the Austrian Empire
Gherla